Kaya may refer to:

People
Kaya (given name)
Kaya (surname)

Places
Kaya, Burkina Faso, a town in Burkina Faso, capital of the department
Kaya Airport, serving the town
Kaya Department, a department or commune of Sanmatenga Province in central Burkina Faso
Kaya, Fethiye, a village in Muğla Province, Turkey
Kaya, Hopa, a village in Artvin Province, Turkey
Kaya, Kyoto, a town located in Yosa District, Kyoto Prefecture, Japan
Kaya (Mijikenda), a sacred forest site of the Mijikenda peoples in Kenya
Kaya, South Sudan, a town in South Sudan
Skiu-Kaya, adjoining villages in Ladakh, India
 Kaya confederacy, an alternate romanization of the ancient Gaya confederacy on the Korean peninsula

Popular culture
Kaya (film), a 1969 Yugoslav film
Kaya FM, a radio station in Johannesburg, South Africa
Kaya (TV series), a scripted MTV drama television series

Anime
Kaya (One Piece), a fictional character in the anime and manga One Piece
Kaya (Princess Mononoke), a character from the anime movie Princess Mononoke

Literature 

 Kaya Press, an independent publisher

Music
Kaya (album), an album by Bob Marley and the Wailers (1978)
Kaya Tour, a concert tour organised to support the album
 "Kaya," the title track of the album
Kaya (Canadian singer) (born 1968), real name Francis Martin Lavergne
Kaya (Japanese musician), former member of Schwarz Stein
Kaya (Mauritian musician) (1960–1999), singer and creator of Seggae
Kaya, a vocal group in the Australian version of The X Factor
Kaya (Bulgarian band) (1999–present)

Other uses
Gaya confederacy, a confederacy in southern Korea (42–562 CE)
Kaya Airlines, a Mozambican airline
Kaya F.C., a Filipino association football club
Kaya identity, an equation relating factors that determine the level of human impact on climate, in the form of emissions of the greenhouse gas carbon dioxide
Kaya (jam), a type of coconut egg jam popular in Malaysia, Singapore and Indonesia
Kaya-no-miya, the seventh oldest collateral branch (ōke) of the Japanese Imperial Family
Kaya toast, a popular snack amongst Malaysians and Singaporeans and other SE Asians
Kaya (tree), Torreya nucifera, or Japanese Nutmeg tree
, several ships
Trikaya, the Buddhist doctrine of three kayas (bodies) of Buddha

See also

Kayah (disambiguation)
Kaia (disambiguation)
Kaja (disambiguation)